Joseph Tritton (1819–1887) was a British Quaker banker.

Early life
Joseph Tritton was born in 1819. He was the son of Henry Tritton and Amelia Benwell.

Career
Tritton was a partner in Barclay, Bevan, Tritton & Co (now Barclays Bank) for forty years.

Philanthropy
He was Treasurer of the Baptist Foreign Missionary Society, and wrote hymns and poems.

Personal life
On 8 November 1843, he married Amelia Hanson, daughter of Joseph Hanson, and they had five children:
 Joseph Herbert Tritton (1844-1923)
 Sir Ernest Tritton, 1st Baronet (1845-1918)
 Annette Amelia Tritton (1847-1873), she married William Leatham Barclay, the son of Joseph Gurney Barclay
 Jessie Margaret Tritton (1857-1943), never married
 Ethel Harriett Tritton (1859-1885), never married

Death
He died in 1887.

References

1819 births
1887 deaths
English bankers
Barclays people
Joseph
British Quakers
19th-century English businesspeople